Cobi N'Gai Jones (born June 16, 1970) is an American former professional soccer player and commentator. He is an analyst for MLS Season Pass on Apple TV. He has also been seen on Time Warner Cable SportsNet, Fox Sports, BeIN Sports, the Pac-12 Network, and as the host of the Totally Football Show: American Edition.

As a player, Jones was a midfielder from 1994 until 2007, starting his career in England with Premier League club Coventry City, before playing for Brazilian side Vasco da Gama. He is one of a significant group of American national team stars who returned from overseas to aid the then new Major League Soccer in 1996, beginning an 11-year spell with the LA Galaxy. Jones is the all-time leader in caps for the United States national team and a member of the National Soccer Hall of Fame.

Following retirement, Jones served as an assistant coach with the LA Galaxy for two seasons.

Youth
Jones grew up in Southern California. He played soccer with AYSO starting at age 5 in Westlake Village, California.
After graduating from Westlake High School, Jones emerged as a talented player in college, making the UCLA soccer team as a non-scholarship player, ultimately becoming one of its most successful soccer-playing graduates. While attending UCLA, Jones was a member of Lambda Chi Alpha, an international fraternity.

Club career
After playing in the 1994 World Cup held in the United States, Jones signed with English team Coventry City of the Premier League, where he spent one season. Jones trained with a German club 1. FC Köln of the Bundesliga before joining Brazilian club Vasco da Gama after impressive performances with the United States national team in the 1995 Copa America. After only a few months in Brazil, Jones signed with the new Los Angeles Galaxy franchise for Major League Soccer's inaugural season.

Jones's best year with the Galaxy came in 1998, when he was second in MLS with 51 points (19 goals and 13 assists), was named to the MLS Best XI, and was also named U.S. Soccer Athlete of the Year. In 2005, he became the last player in MLS to remain with his original team since 1996.  Jones announced on March 19, 2007, that he would retire following the season.

International career
Jones is currently the all-time leader of the United States in appearances, with 164 caps as of the end of 2004 (scoring 15 goals). He played for the team in the 1994, 1998, and 2002 FIFA World Cups. He was named to the best XI at the 2000 CONCACAF Gold Cup and won with the national team at the 2002 CONCACAF Gold Cup. He also represented his country at the 1992 Summer Olympics in Barcelona. After playing in the 1995 Copa America, he also became a popular player in Latin America because the nickname used by an Argentine commentator to call him: "Escobillón" ("swab"), due to his bleached dreadlock hairstyle and the similar pronunciation of his name, Is Cobi Jones, and the word "escobillón".

Coaching career
On November 9, 2007, Jones was announced as an assistant coach with the Galaxy under Ruud Gullit. After Gullit's resignation on August 11, 2008, Jones served as the interim head coach until the Galaxy hired Jones's former United States national team head coach Bruce Arena.

In January 2011, Jones left the Galaxy to serve as associate director of soccer with the New York Cosmos and was with the club through 2012.

Personal life
On September 12, 2009, Jones married Kim Reese. Reese, a music consultant and former music executive at New Line Cinema, met Jones in 2003 and began dating him in 2004. The couple was married at the Four Seasons Resort Aviara in Carlsbad, California. They have two sons, Cayden and Cai.

On March 11, 2011, Jones was selected for induction into the National Soccer Hall of Fame in his first year of eligibility.

Career statistics

Club

International

Scores and results list the United States' goal tally first, score column indicates score after each Jones goal.

Honors
Los Angeles Galaxy
 CONCACAF Champions' Cup: 2000
 MLS Cup: 2002, 2005
 Supporters' Shield: 1998, 2002
 U.S. Open Cup: 2001, 2005
 Western Conference (playoffs): 1996, 1999, 2001, 2002, 2005

United States
 CONCACAF Gold Cup: 2002

Individual
 MLS 25 Greatest

See also
 List of men's footballers with 100 or more international caps

References

External links
 
 Cobi Jones Biography at Los Angeles Galaxy official site 
 Cobi Jones Interview

1970 births
Living people
Sportspeople from Ventura County, California
Soccer players from Detroit
Soccer players from California
African-American soccer players
American soccer players
Association football midfielders
UCLA Bruins men's soccer players
American Youth Soccer Organization players
Coventry City F.C. players
CR Vasco da Gama players
LA Galaxy players
Premier League players
Campeonato Brasileiro Série A players
Major League Soccer players
Major League Soccer All-Stars
United States men's under-23 international soccer players
Olympic soccer players of the United States
United States men's international soccer players
Footballers at the 1992 Summer Olympics
1992 King Fahd Cup players
1993 Copa América players
1993 CONCACAF Gold Cup players
1994 FIFA World Cup players
1995 Copa América players
1996 CONCACAF Gold Cup players
1998 CONCACAF Gold Cup players
1998 FIFA World Cup players
1999 FIFA Confederations Cup players
2000 CONCACAF Gold Cup players
2002 CONCACAF Gold Cup players
2002 FIFA World Cup players
CONCACAF Gold Cup-winning players
FIFA Century Club
National Soccer Hall of Fame members
American expatriate soccer players
American expatriate sportspeople in England
American expatriate sportspeople in Brazil
Expatriate footballers in England
Expatriate footballers in Brazil
American soccer coaches
LA Galaxy non-playing staff
LA Galaxy coaches
Major League Soccer coaches
Major League Soccer broadcasters
21st-century African-American sportspeople
20th-century African-American sportspeople
Pan American Games gold medalists for the United States
Pan American Games medalists in football
Medalists at the 1991 Pan American Games
Footballers at the 1991 Pan American Games